Kendal Rugby Football Club is an English rugby union team based in Kendal, Cumbria. The first XV currently plays in Regional 1 North West, a level five league in the English league system, following the club's promotion from North 1 West at the end of the 2021–22 season.

History
Kendal RUFC was formed in 1905. moving to their present ground at Mint Bridge in 1927. The club found success in the decades before league rugby was introduced in 1987 and the club was placed in North One. By the turn of the century they were in National Division Two, finishing in fourth place in their first season in the third tier of English rugby. In 2002–03 they were relegated for the first time in the club's history and have subsequently dropped down two further levels.

Ground
Originally based at Maude's Meadow until 1906, Kendal moved to Mint Bridge off Shap Road in 1927.  The original Mint Bridge had a capacity of 3,000 (including 300 in the stand) - which was the attendance achieved in 1999 when Kendal lost 20-25 to London Scottish in the fourth round of the Tetley's Bitter Cup.  They would remain at the old Mint Bridge up until the end of the 2016-17 season when they sold the land to Sainsbury's for the construction of a supermarket.  The money from the sale would enable Kendal to build a new ground (retaining the Mint Bridge name) just up the road.  It would cost up to £11 million - a figure that included a £3.5 million club-house - and development would officially begin in July 2016, undertaken by local construction group Pinington.  The ground was completed in time for the 2017-18 season, with the first game taking place against Preston Grasshoppers on 30 September 2017 - a 19-25 defeat in front of a crowd of over 1,000 supporters.

The new Mint Bridge Stadium has a 4G pitch with electronic scoreboard alongside the club-house/stand, with additional facilities including a function room, kitchen, cafe, children's play area and memorial garden.  Capacity at the ground allows for up to 3,000 standing pitch side, along with 258 seats in the stand and space for 200 on the club-house balcony, bringing total capacity to approximately 3,500.

Honours
1st team:
Westmorland & Furness Cup winners (10): 1974, 1985, 1990, 1991, 1992, 1993, 1994, 1995, 1996, 2000
North 1 champions (2): 1988–89, 2007–08
Cumbria Cup winners (5): 1995, 1998, 2007, 2008, 2018
Jewson National League 2 North champions: 1999–00
North 1 West champions: 2015–16

2nd team:
Cumbria Shield winners: 1996
Cumbria Vase winners (3): 2008, 2009, 2012

Notes

See also
Rugby union in Cumbria

References

External links
 Official club website

English rugby union teams
Kendal
Rugby clubs established in 1905
Rugby union in Cumbria
1905 establishments in England